Leuconitocris singularis is a species of beetle in the family Cerambycidae. It was described by Pierre Téocchi in 1994.

References

Leuconitocris
Beetles described in 1994